The 1938 County Championship was the 45th officially organised running of the County Championship. Yorkshire County Cricket Club won their 20th title. The points system for the Championship was altered as follows -

 12 pts for a win
 6 pts for a tie
 4 pts for a first innings lead in a match either drawn or lost
 8 pts for a win in a match under one day rules

Table

 includes 2 pts for a tie on first innings of a lost match

References

1938 in English cricket
County Championship seasons